Özer Umdu (born 1 January 1952) is a Turkish retired professional football player who played as a forward.

Professional career
Umdu was the top scorer, or Gol Kralı, for the 1978–79 1.Lig with 15 goals.

References

External links
 

Living people
1952 births
Sportspeople from Balıkesir
Turkish footballers
Süper Lig players
TFF First League players
Balıkesirspor footballers
Zonguldakspor footballers
Adanaspor footballers
Beşiktaş J.K. footballers
Association football forwards